Henry 'Harry' Bolewski (1890−1976) was an Australian rugby league footballer and coach of the early 20th century. A Queensland state and Australia national representative goal-kicking back-line player, he played his club football in Brisbane and Sydney. Bolewski later coached in the New South Wales Rugby Football League premiership for Sydney's Western Suburbs club. He was also the younger brother of prominent rugby league footballers, Alex Bolewski and Mick Bolewski.

Playing career
From a Polish family and born at Rous Mill near Ballina, Bolewski went to Sydney where he played for Glebe DRLFC, making his first grade debut in the 1912 NSWRFL season. He also played in the Queensland town of Bundaberg, and first gained selection for the Queensland rugby league team in 1913, during which he played in two matches against New South Wales. After moving to Brisbane, Bolewski was selected alongside both of his brothers to play for Queensland against the 1914 Great Britain Lions tourists. He was then the only Queenslander selected to play for Australia in the first Ashes Test against the touring Britons in Sydney, becoming Kangaroo No. 87. He played on the wing and kicked the home side's sole goal in their loss to the British. The following season he rejoined his brother Alex at Glebe, scoring his team's only try in their loss to Eastern Suburbs in the City Cup final. Both players later spent time with the Newtown club. The 1921 NSWRFL season, Bolewski's last, was spent with Glebe.

Coaching career
For the 1944 NSWRFL season Bolewski became coach the Western Suburbs club, replacing Alf Blair, who moved to South Sydney. Wests improved slightly on the previous season, finishing 5th (out of 8), but failing to make the finals, and Bolewski was replaced by club great, Frank McMillan.

Harry Bolewski died on 26 August 1976, aged 86, late of Cartwright, New South Wales.

References

External links
Henry Bolewski at stats.rleague.com

1890 births
1976 deaths
Australia national rugby league team players
Australian people of Polish descent
Australian rugby league coaches
Australian rugby league players
Glebe rugby league players
Newtown Jets players
Queensland rugby league team players
Rugby league wingers
Rugby league players from Ballina, New South Wales
Western Suburbs Magpies coaches